Codreni is a village in Cimișlia District, Moldova, about  to the south of Chișinău. It is composed of two villages, Codreni and Zloți station.

History
Valeriu Săînu became mayor after the 2007 local elections.

Notable people
Nicolae Dabija, writer and politician

References

External links

Communes of Cimișlia District